Joyce Skefu (born 14 April 1964), is a Motswana-South African actress and voice artist. She is best known for the roles in the television serials such as; Muvhango, Scandal! and Abomama.

Personal life
Skefu was born on 14 April 1964 in Botswana and moved to Soweto, Gauteng. She later grew up in Bloemfontein with her grandparents and Lesotho. She graduated with a higher Diploma in Beauty Therapy from the University of St. Thomas, Texas, Houston.

She was married, but her husband passed away after few years of marriage. She is a mother of two children. She was involved in two car accidents in 2010 and 2014, but survived with minor injuries.

Career
In 1997, she made television debut with the soap opera Muvhango and played the role "Doris Mokoena" with huge popularity. For her role, she was nominated five times as a Best Actress and won 2 of them. Then she won the Duku Duku award, voted by the public. She was then celebrated as a “crowd puller” by SABC2, where her signature line, “You must never . . .” became a fan following. Then she made film debut in 1998 with the Direct-to-video film Voete van Goud and played the role "Maphiri". In early 2000, she appeared on the popular AIDS drama series Phamokate.

In 2015, she joined with the cast of popular e.tv soap opera Scandal! where she played the role as "Maletsatsi Khumalo" for more than 12 consecutive years. In 2018, she played the role "Fumane" in the Mzansi Magic drama series Abomama. After gained popularity, she reprised her role in the second season of the series. In the meantime, she also appeared in the second season of another Mzansi Magic drama series Imposter with the role "Valeta". She also won the Best actress in theatre award in London at White House Theatre. In 2020, she joined with the SABC2 telenovela and played the role "Moipone".

Apart from acting, she appeared in front of public with many professions such as; health advisor, aerobics instructor, first aid Red Cross Facilitator, HIV/AIDS councillor, Ambassador for SA Tourism, and Minister of the church.

Filmography

References

External links

1964 births
Living people
South African film actresses
South African television actresses
South African stage actresses